Balloon hashing is a key derivation function presenting proven memory-hard password-hashing and modern design. It was created by Dan Boneh, Henry Corrigan-Gibbs (both at Stanford University) and Stuart Schechter (Microsoft Research) in 2016. It is a recommended function in NIST password guidelines.

The authors claim that Balloon:
 has proven memory-hardness properties,
 is built from standard primitives: it can use any standards non-space-hard cryptographic hash function as a sub-algorithm (e.g., SHA-3, SHA-512),
 is resistant to side-channel attacks: the memory access pattern is independent of the data to be hashed,
 is easy to implement and matches the performance of similar algorithms.

Balloon is compared by its authors with Argon2, a similarly performing algorithm.

Algorithm 
There are three steps in the algorithm:
 Expansion, where an initial buffer is filled with a pseudorandom byte sequence derived from the password and salt repeatedly hashed.
 Mixing, where the bytes in the buffer are mixed time_cost number of times.
 Output, where a portion of the buffer is taken as the hashing result.

References

External links 
 Research prototype code on Github
 Python implementation
 Rust implementation
 
 

Key derivation functions